Jake the Plumber is a 1927 American silent comedy film directed by Edward Ludwig and starring Jesse De Vorska, Sharon Lynn and Rosa Rosanova.

Synopsis
The film follows the adventures of Jake, a Jewish apprentice to the Irish plumber Fogarty. Jake wants to earn enough money to marry Sarah, a jealous girl, who he is in love with. The chance comes when he has to substitute for a jockey in a big horse race.

Cast
 Jesse De Vorska as Jake, the Plumber 
 Sharon Lynn as Sarah Levine
 Rosa Rosanova as Mrs. Levine
 Ann Brody as Mrs. Schwartz
 Bud Jamison as Fogarty
 Carol Holloway as Mrs. Levis 
 William H. Tooker as Mr. Levis
 Dolores Brinkman as 	Sadie Rosen
 Eddie Harris as Poppa Levine
 Fanchon Frankel as Rachael Rosenblatt

References

Bibliography
 Connelly, Robert B. The Silents: Silent Feature Films, 1910-36, Volume 40, Issue 2. December Press, 1998.
 Munden, Kenneth White. The American Film Institute Catalog of Motion Pictures Produced in the United States, Part 1. University of California Press, 1997.

External links
 

1927 films
1927 comedy films
1920s English-language films
American silent feature films
Silent American comedy films
Films directed by Edward Ludwig
American black-and-white films
Film Booking Offices of America films
1920s American films